is a 1997 video game for the arcades developed by Japanese studio Psikyo. It was later ported to the PlayStation, Sega Saturn, and later PlayStation 2, Microsoft Windows, Nintendo Switch, PlayStation 4 and Xbox One.

Gameplay

Synopsis

Development and release 

The collection was released on February 24, 2005 for the PlayStation 2. It was released for Nintendo Switch on March 22, 2018.

Reception 

Sol Divide received mixed to positive reception from critics since its release.

Notes

References

External links 
 Sol Divide at GameFAQs
 Sol Divide at Killer List of Videogames
 Sol Divide at MobyGames

1997 video games
Arcade video games
Horizontally scrolling shooters
Nintendo Switch games
PlayStation (console) games
PlayStation 2 games
Psikyo games
Video games developed in Japan
Windows games
XS Games games
Taito games
Multiplayer and single-player video games
Cooperative video games
505 Games games